Zachary Noah Somers (born 1979) is an American lawyer who serves as a  judge of the United States Court of Federal Claims.

Education 

Somers earned a Bachelor of Arts, cum laude, from Georgetown University, and a Juris Doctor from the Georgetown University Law Center, where he served as the editor-in-chief of the Georgetown Journal of Law & Public Policy.

Legal career 

Upon graduation from law school, Somers served as a law clerk to Judge Victor J. Wolski of the United States Court of Federal Claims. He was an attorney at the boutique Washington, D.C., law firm Marzulla Law, LLC, where he specialized in takings and breach of contract litigation before the Court of Federal Claims and other federal courts. He served over a decade on the United States House Committee on the Judiciary staff in several counsel roles, including as the Committee's General Counsel and Parliamentarian. Before becoming a judge, he served as the Chief Investigative Counsel for the United States Senate Committee on the Judiciary, where he handled oversight and investigations for Chairman Lindsey Graham.

Federal judicial service 

On August 26, 2020, President Trump announced his intent to nominate Somers to serve as a judge of the United States Court of Federal Claims. On September 8, 2020, his nomination was sent to the Senate. President Trump nominated Somers to the seat vacated by Judge Thomas C. Wheeler, who assumed senior status on October 23, 2020. On November 18, 2020, a hearing on his nomination was held before the Senate Judiciary Committee. On December 10, 2020, his nomination was reported out of committee by a 13–9 vote. On December 17, 2020, the United States Senate invoked cloture on his nomination by a 52–42 vote. His nomination was confirmed later that day by a 52–43 vote. He received his judicial commission on December 22, 2020, and was sworn in on December 23, 2020.

References

External links 
 

1979 births
Living people
21st-century American lawyers
21st-century American judges
Georgetown University alumni
Georgetown University Law Center alumni
Judges of the United States Court of Federal Claims
Lawyers from Washington, D.C.
Maryland lawyers
United States Article I federal judges appointed by Donald Trump
United States House of Representatives lawyers
United States Senate lawyers